A desiccant is a hygroscopic substance that is used to induce or sustain a state of dryness (desiccation) in its vicinity; it is the opposite of a humectant.  Commonly encountered pre-packaged desiccants are solids that absorb water. Desiccants for specialized purposes may be in forms other than solid, and may work through other principles, such as chemical bonding of water molecules.  They are commonly encountered in foods to retain crispness.  Industrially, desiccants are widely used to control the level of water in gas streams.

Types of desiccants

Although some desiccants are chemically inert, others are extremely reactive and require specialized handling techniques.  The most common desiccant is silica gel, an otherwise inert, nontoxic, water-insoluble white solid.  Tens of thousands of tons are produced annually for this purpose.   Other common desiccants include activated charcoal, calcium sulfate, calcium chloride, and molecular sieves (typically, zeolites). Desiccants may also be categorized by their type, either I,II,III,IV, or V. These types are a function of the shape of the desiccant's moisture sorption isotherm. 

Alcohols and acetones are also dehydrating agents.

Performance efficiency 
One measure of desiccant efficiency is the ratio (or percentage) of water storable in the desiccant relative to the mass of desiccant.

Another measure is the residual relative humidity of the air or other fluid being dried.

The performance of any desiccant varies with temperature and both relative humidity and absolute humidity. To some extent, desiccant performance can be precisely described, but most commonly, the final choice of which desiccant best suits a given situation, how much of it to use, and in what form, is made based on testing and practical experience.

Colored saturation indicators
 
Sometimes a humidity indicator is included in the desiccant to show, by color changes, the degree of water-saturation of the desiccant. One commonly used indicator is cobalt chloride (CoCl2). Anhydrous cobalt chloride is blue.  When it bonds with two water molecules, (CoCl2•2H2O), it turns purple. Further hydration results in the pink hexaaquacobalt(II) chloride complex [Co(H2O)6]Cl2.

Applications
One example of desiccant usage is in the manufacture of insulated windows where zeolite spheroids fill a rectangular spacer tube at the perimeter of the panes of glass. The desiccant helps to prevent the condensation of moisture between the panes. Another use of zeolites is in the "dryer" component of refrigeration systems to absorb water carried by the refrigerant, whether residual water left over from the construction of the system, or water released by the degradation of other materials over time.

Bagged desiccants are also commonly used to protect goods in  barrier-sealed shipping containers against moisture damage: rust, corrosion, etc.  Hygroscopic cargo, such as cocoa, coffee, various nuts and grains, and other foods can be particularly susceptible to mold and rot when exposed to condensation and humidity. Because of this, shippers often take measures by deploying desiccants to protect against loss.  Pharmaceutical packaging often includes small packets of desiccant to keep the atmosphere inside the package below critical levels of water vapor.

Desiccants induce dryness in any environment and reduce the amount of moisture present in air. Desiccants come in various forms and have found widespread use in the food, pharmaceuticals, packing, electronics and many manufacturing industries.

Air conditioning systems can be based on desiccants, as drier air feels more comfortable and absorbing water itself removes heat.

Desiccants are used in livestock farming, where, for example, new-born piglets are highly susceptible to hypothermia owing to their wetness.

Drying of solvents

Desiccants are also used to remove water from solvents, typically required by chemical reactions that do not tolerate water, e.g., the Grignard reaction. The method generally, though not always, involves mixing the solvent with the solid desiccant.  Studies show that molecular sieves are superior as desiccants relative to chemical drying reagents such as sodium-benzophenone.  Sieves offer the advantages of being safe in air and recyclable.

See also
 Desiccator
 Humidity buffering
 Humidity indicator card
 Moisture sorption isotherm
 Solar air conditioning
 Oxygen scavenger (oxygen absorber)
 Sorbent
 Volatile corrosion inhibitor
 Cromer cycle

References

Further reading
 
 

 
Packaging